Freight Train Heart is the third studio album by Australian rock singer, Jimmy Barnes, released in November 1987 in Australia by Mushroom Records and in early 1988 in the United States by Geffen. It spent 5 weeks at the top of the Australian Album charts in December 1987 and January 1988.

Details
Most of the tracks were written by Barnes and one of the producers, Jonathan Cain, however "Waitin' for the Heartache" was co-written by Barnes and Desmond Child and "Walk On" was co-written by Child and ex-Rainbow vocalist Joe Lynn Turner; (Turner would later record his own version with his band Sunstorm). Two songs were also written with Jim Vallance. According to Vallance, Cain also contributed "later", most likely during the recording process.

"Seven Days" was a Ronnie Wood track originally written for him by Bob Dylan. This was the last song recorded for the album, and features INXS drummer Jon Farriss, bassist Chris Bailey and Rick Brewster from The Angels. Brewster, Johnny Diesel, Peter Kekell and The Angels' Jim Hilbun were all hired after Barnes returned with the uncompleted master tapes from the initial recording sessions at the Power Station in New York City, where he had fought for creative control with both Cain and Geffen Records. The album was completed at Rhinoceros Studios in Sydney with Mike Stone producing. Other guests to contribute include Huey Lewis, who provides backing vocals and harmonica on "I Wanna Get Started With You", Wendy Matthews and David Glen Eisley of the melodic hard rock band Giuffria.

Ian Moss was booked to play on the album, but pulled out. Barnes said, "He was supposed to but he chickened out. He is so worried about living up to this legendary status of Cold Chisel. He thought people might compare it and he might come out looking worse."

Track listing
"Driving Wheels" (Jimmy Barnes, Jonathan Cain, David Roberts) - 5:16
"Seven Days" (Bob Dylan) - 3:23
"Too Much Ain't Enough Love" (Barnes, Cain, Neal Schon, Randy Jackson, Tony Brock) - 4:44
"Do or Die" (Barnes, Cain) - 3:51
"Waitin' for the Heartache" (Barnes, Desmond Child) - 4:34
"Last Frontier" (Barnes, Cain) - 5:29
"I Wanna Get Started with You" (Barnes, Cain, Schon) - 3:46
"I'm Still on Your Side" (Barnes, Jim Vallance, Cain) - 4:00
"Lessons in Love" (Barnes, Vallance, Jeff Neill, Cain) - 3:45
"Walk On" (Child, Joe Lynn Turner) - 4:14

Personnel
 Jimmy Barnes - vocals
 Neal Schon, Johnny Diesel, Rick Brewster, John McCurry - guitar
 Randy Jackson, Chris Bailey, Jim Hilbun, Seth Glassman - bass
 Tony Brock, Jon Farriss, Jerry Marotta - drums
 Jonathan Cain, Peter Kekell, Gregg Mangiafico - keyboards, piano
 Chuck Kentis - synthesizer
 Ian Moss - zither
 Huey Lewis - harmonica
 David Lindley - steel guitar
 Jimmy Barnes, Huey Lewis, Wendy Matthews, David Glen Eisley, Johnny Diesel, Dave Amato, Lynette Stephens, Jim Hilbun, Walter Hawkins, Shaun Murphy, Venetta Fields, Joe Lynn Turner - backing vocals
Technical
 Mastering Engineer - Rick O’Neil Festival Records Australia

Chart positions

Year-end charts

Certifications

See also

 List of number-one albums in Australia during the 1980s

References

1987 albums
Albums produced by Desmond Child
Jimmy Barnes albums
Mushroom Records albums